Crassaminicella is a genus of bacteria from the family of Clostridiaceae, with one known species (Crassaminicella profunda). Crassaminicella profunda has been isolated from deep sea sediments from the Southern Trough from the Guaymas Basin.

References

Clostridiaceae
Monotypic bacteria genera
Bacteria genera